Behind the Mountains is the second full-length studio album by Norwegian hard rock, heavy blues rock band Brutus. It was released on 14 June 2013 by Svart Records. The Japanese version contains the bonus track, "Be Good and Be Kind", originally by Tin House.

Track listing
All songs written by Brutus.
 "The Witches Remains " - 4:58
 "Personal Riot" - 3:54
 "Big Fat Boogie" - 3:43
 "Blue Pills" - 6:11
 "Square Headed Dog" - 4:39
 "Mystery Machine" - 3:48
 "Crystal Parrot" - 4:13
 "Reflections" - 6:56
 "Can't Help Wondering Why" - 6:41
 "Be Good and Be Kind" (Tin House cover) Japan version only bonus track) - 3:46

Personnel

Brutus
Karl Johan Forsberg: Guitars
Kim Molander: Guitars
Christian "Krille" Hellqvist: Bass
Nils Joakim Stenby: Vocals
Knut-Ole Mathisen: Drums, Percussion

Additional musicians
Gustaf Gimstedt: Electronic organ, Korg MS-20
Per Riihiaho: Harmonica

2013 albums
Brutus (Norwegian band) albums